The 2011–12 season is Al Ahly's 55th season in the Egyptian Premier League. Al Ahly are defending champions for an eighth consecutive year.

Matches

Egyptian Super Cup 2011
The match was played behind closed doors in Alexandria on 9 September 2012. Al-Ahly were 2–1 victors via a 65th-minute goal from Abdullah-Said and 90+2 minute winner from 'Gedo'.

Egyptian Premier League

Standings

First round

Results summary

Top goalscorers
5 Goals : Emad Moteab

3 Goals : Abdallah Said

2 Goals : Walid Soliman ; Hossam Ghaly ; Wael Gomaa ; Mohamed Nagy "Geddo" ; Mohamed Aboutrika 

1 Goal : Ahmed Fathi

Squad

First team squad

Youth academy squad

Transfers made in last season
Players in / out

In

Out

Coaching staff

Al Ahly SC seasons
Al Ahly